The Bulgar calendar was a solar calendar system used by the Bulgars,  a Turkic people, originally from Central Asia, who from the 4th century onwards dwelt in the Eurasian steppes north of the Caucasus and around the banks of river Volga. In 681, part of the Bulgars settled in the Balkan peninsula and established First Bulgarian Empire. The main source of information used for reconstruction of the Bulgar calendar is a short 15th century transcript in Church Slavonic called Nominalia of the Bulgarian Khans, which contains 10 pairs of calendar terms. Additionally, the same dating system is used in a marginal note in a manuscript by 10th century monk Tudor Doksov and in the Chatalar Inscription by the 9th-century Bulgaria ruler Omurtag (r. 814-831), who also provides the Byzantine imperial dating equivalent (the indiction). According to the reconstructed calendar, the Bulgars used a 12-year cyclic calendar similar to the one adopted by Turkic peoples from the Chinese calendar, with names and numbers that are deciphered as in Bulgar language. The reading, along with the "cyclic calendar" interpretation itself, was originally proposed by Finnish Slavist Jooseppi Julius Mikkola in 1913. Later, there have been various modifications and elaborations during the 20th century by scholars such as Géza Fehér, Omeljan Pritsak, Mosko Moskov and other scientists.

Reconstructions vary slightly, because some of the names are unattested, and the exact form of a few is debatable. The following list is based on Mosko Moskov's and description of the average mainstream interpretation, as well as his own reconstruction, and takes into account the existing disagreements:

Years:

References and notes

External links
Computer Model of the Bulgarian Calendar and comparison with the Gregorian Calendar
Bulgarian Sun-Jupiter calendar
Article on Bulgarian calendar
Book about Old Bulgarians
Ednazhden
peripetiite na kalendara

Ancient calendars
First Bulgarian Empire
Obsolete calendars
Calendar
Specific calendars